is a Japanese footballer who plays for Sanfrecce Hiroshima.

National team career
In August 2016, Shiotani was elected Japan U-23 national team as over age for 2016 Summer Olympics. At this tournament, he played full-time in all three matches as centre back with Naomichi Ueda.

Club statistics
Updated to 23 February 2017.

1Includes FIFA Club World Cup, J. League Championship and Japanese Super Cup.

National team statistics

International goals
Scores and results list Japan's goal tally first.

Honours

Club
Sanfrecce Hiroshima
J. League Division 1 (3) : 2012, 2013, 2015
J.League Cup (1) : 2022
Japanese Super Cup (3) : 2013, 2014, 2016

International
Japan
AFC Asian Cup: Runner-up 2019

Individual
J. League Best Eleven (3) : 2014, 2015, 2016

References

External links

 
 Tsukasa Shiotani at the Japan National Football Team
 
Profile at Sanfrecce Hiroshima
 

1988 births
Living people
Kokushikan University alumni
Association football people from Tokushima Prefecture
Japanese footballers
Japan international footballers
Japanese expatriate sportspeople in the United Arab Emirates
J1 League players
J2 League players
Mito HollyHock players
Sanfrecce Hiroshima players
Al Ain FC players
2015 AFC Asian Cup players
2019 AFC Asian Cup players
Footballers at the 2016 Summer Olympics
Olympic footballers of Japan
Association football defenders
UAE Pro League players